Max Coll (February 26, 1932 - March 27, 2014) was a prominent New Mexico politician.

Political career

Early years in Roswell 

Although his income was earned from oil and gas interests, Max W. Coll II's primary career was that of politician. Once elected to the New Mexico House of Representatives representing a Chaves County district from 1966 to 1970 as a Republican, Coll served as Republican Legislative Whip, and as a delegate to the state's last Constitutional Convention in 1969. Always concerned about the environment and social justice issues, Coll introduced a bill requiring deposits on bottles and cans during his first term, and supported the country's Equal Rights Amendment, which wasn't ratified by New Mexico until 1972.

Icon of Santa Fe 

After moving to the state's capitol of Santa Fe, Coll once again returned to politics in the 1980s, elected to represent Santa Fe's District 47 in 1981 as a Republican. To the surprise of many, in 1983 Coll changed parties from Republican to Democrat in order to tip the partisan balance in the House, and to get more Democrats to support his bills. Despite his change of party, Coll was re-elected by District 47's voters for 15 consecutive terms, usually with a landslide vote in his favor. One way Coll accomplished this was to knock on every door and speak with every possible voter in his district while campaigning. Coll got flogged by geese and bit by dogs, but he continued the practice in order to keep in touch with his constituents.

All in all, Coll served a total of 32 years in the New Mexico House of Representatives, 18 of them as Chair of the House Appropriations and Finance Committee. Coll also served on the House Taxation and Revenue Committee and as head of the Legislative Finance Committee, which serves as the permanent budget oversight panel to New Mexico's legislature. Despite his liberal stances on social justice and the environment, Coll was considered a fiscal conservative and managed the state's finances under five different governors from both parties, locking horns with both Republicans and Democrats to protect the state's money. Coll described his views to a reporter during his 2000 campaign as, "I think we really need to work on overcoming poverty and ignorance and poor health care... I think we should target those things, and I think government has a big role in those things." After he retired in 2004, Coll remained interested in politics, consulting with legislators who sought his advice, and even lecturing on techniques of successful lobbying at a workshop given by the League of Women Voters of New Mexico in 2007.

Energetic legislator 

An early supporter of universal healthcare, in 1993 Coll joined Representative Luciano "Lucky" Varela, D-Santa Fe, and sponsored "NewMexicare," a single-payer healthcare system designed after Canada's that was defeated then, and again when another version of it was re-introduced in 1999. In 1994, Coll considered running as a fusion candidate of both the New Mexico Green Party and the Democrats, but withdrew under pressure from the state's Democratic Party. Also in 1994, in an effort to save the time and money of New Mexico's students in higher education, Coll spearheaded efforts, eventually successful, to ensure that credits earned at the state's two-year colleges were viable at the state's four-year institutions. In 1997, Coll's whistle-blower protection legislation was stopped by opponents from the business sector. When asked for his stance on same-sex marriage in 2003, Coll felt that churches have the right to take whatever stance they choose with their own memberships. But he also felt that the state had an obligation to define civil unions, saying, "I'm very much in favor of not interfering at all with people's private sexual life or preferences...As far as civil law, we should stay out of sexual practices." In February 2003, Coll attended a rally opposing the United States' eventual military invasion of Iraq. However, after becoming the powerful chair of the House Appropriations and FInance Committee, Coll chose to sponsor fewer bills of his own as a strategic move. Coll felt that if he were to sponsor a great number of bills, his position of power might be weakened by the need to negotiate in a variety of directions. Instead, Coll sponsored a few pet bills each session, and was satisfied to throw his weight behind a colleague when he or she introduced a bill Coll could support.

Coll was occasionally known to be a stickler for the letter of the law. The lawsuit which gained Coll the most notoriety was brought in 1995. Coll, along with state Representative George Buffett, R-Albuquerque, and Guy Clark of the New Mexico Coalition Against Gambling petitioned together against then-Governor Gary Johnson for forming gaming compacts with state tribes without legislative approval. The case ended up before the New Mexico Supreme Court, which declared the gambling compacts between New Mexico tribes and then-Governor Gary Johnson void. The next year, due to inaccurate reporting by the Albuquerque Journal, this action got confused in the minds of some with a federal lawsuit brought by different plaintiffs seeking to declare casinos illegal in New Mexico. This confusion resulted in the formation by Pojoaque Pueblo members of a political action committee called "K'ema" or Tewa for friend, the sole goal of which was to defeat Coll's re-election on the grounds that he was racist. In reply, Coll held that, "I'm going to run my campaign like I always have. I have long taken the position that Native Americans don't have a fair piece of the pie, and I'm going to continue to work on that." Despite K'ema's donation of $100,000 to his Republican opponent, Coll won his election and the Pojoaque Pueblo now operates a large casino outside Santa Fe. Another time, Coll and Republican colleague Jerry Lee Alwin, R-Albuquerque, sued the state over a bond-issue designed to fund prisons in 1997. Even after he retired from the legislature, Coll was not shy to engage in a legal battle. In 2006, he filed a class-action lawsuit against New Mexico's Public Regulatory Commission and its insurance department over fixed prices and price-gouging title insurance sales.  Coll also sued to keep a candidate with an insufficient number of signatures on her nominating petition off District 47's ballot in 2008, stating, "Rules are rules."

Never shy to be honest about his personal life, Coll often cited experience in his reasons for backing certain bills. In a battle with then-Governor Gary Johnson over a plan to place the state's Medicaid program in the hands of managed healthcare, Coll's objections included the death of his daughter. Coll told the Legislative Finance Committee in 1996 that his daughter's symptoms would have been noticed and addressed had she been allowed by her managed care to see the same doctor at each visit. As it was, a benign tumor that went undetected caused her to die, along with the baby girl she had carried for almost nine months. About managed-care systems, ""It may be saving money, but at what cost? It's very, very shabby care." Coll said. "When are we going to quit kidding ourselves that we're going to save money by cutting services to poor people? It's outrageous." Accusing these systems of caring only for profits and not for patients, Coll added, "They basically get around [costs] by not doing tests that people need." Then, in February 1999, the N.M. House proposed a bill that would require those with multiple convictions for Driving Under the Influence (DUI) to pay for the installation of, and use, ignition inter-lock devices on their vehicles for six months before having their driving privileges restored. Coll proposed a tougher amendment, which was defeated, that the devices be required after the first DUI conviction. He explained his request for stiffer penalties by saying, "Take it from an old alcoholic who used to drive drunk a lot . . . what we need is severe dealing with drunken driving. Drunk drivers are usually people with a drinking problem. They're not casual drinkers."

Colorful character 

New Mexican by birth, Coll began his career in Roswell wearing a crewcut that had become an unruly mop of grey by the time he returned to politics in Santa Fe. Also wearing glasses (and eventually hearing aids), Coll was broad-shouldered and stood just over 6' 2" tall. After his return to New Mexico's House in the 1980s, he was usually seen wearing a stud earring in each ear, a turquoise watchband, and a brightly-colored vest on the Capitol Floor. (Although he also was famous for his impressive collection of bolo ties, Coll could only wear those to committee meetings, since bolos were outlawed by the Capitol's dress code until 2009, after he retired.) Despite his size and strong opinions, Coll was soft-spoken and known for a wry sense of humor. Among his colleagues, Coll gained a reputation for drawing caricatures depicting his viewpoint of their bills, arguments or behavior during legislative sessions and committee meetings. He would later present these to those colleagues, to be kept and cherished, at least by some. Coll also was known for his colorful expressions. In 1991, he responded to an interviewer's question, "Is there a cheaper way to raise revenue other than the gross receipts tax?" by saying, "If frogs had wings, then they wouldn't bump their tails on the rocks." In later years, Coll remembered his 1993 attempt to pass single-payer healthcare by saying, "the insurance industry really came out of the woodwork and stomped on it like a June bug." After crafting the state's 1997 budget proposal as chairman of the House Appropriations and Finance Committee under Governor Gary Johnson, Coll once stated, "If you start with a sow's ear and you cut and stitch . . . you still end up with a sow's ear... It may not be a silk purse, but at least we turned it into a tube sock." In 2000 when the state's Human Services Department "found" some funds where earlier they had reported a deficit, Coll compared the action to "a blind pig's stumbling across an acorn." During 2002 budget hearings, Coll hung a sign in front of his dias that read, "What part of 'There is no money' do you not understand?" Several years after retiring from politics, Coll was quoted as saying, "I'd complain about getting old, but, you know, it doesn't do any good." At Coll's memorial service, Barry Massey, a rafting companion of Coll's and an Associated Press reporter whose longtime beat is Santa Fe's Roundhouse, quoted something Coll had told him about rafting that, Massey said, also applies to life: "In trying to pick a line of travel, [Coll] said, look where the current wants to take you and figure out how to make it better." Of Coll, Massey also said, "He lived as he rowed...He saw where the currents of life and politics wanted to pull and push him, and he figured out a way to make it better."

Family and personal history 
Coll's maternal grandfather was another career politician. New Mexico's sixth governor, Democrat James Fielding Hinkle, moved to the southwest from Missouri where he managed the Penasco Valley's CA Bar Ranch in the 1890s. Before becoming elected as governor in 1922, Hinkle had served as both county commissioner and county treasurer for Lincoln County. Even before New Mexico achieved statehood, Hinkle served as a member of the Territorial Tax Board for 11 years, was elected to the Territorial House of Representatives in 1892, and then to the Territorial Senate in 1901. Switching from state to local politics briefly, Hinkle served as mayor of Roswell from 1904 to 1906. Once New Mexico achieved statehood, Hinkle campaigned and won election to the state senate in 1912, where he served a total of three terms before he was elected Governor of New Mexico in 1922.

Max W. Coll, II, was born February 26, 1932, in Roswell, New Mexico, to Max Welton Coll and Lillian Hinkle Coll and was the eldest of four sons. Coll graduated from New Mexico Military Institute's Junior College and went on to the University of Missouri, where he graduated with a BS in Chemistry in 1954.

He married Martha Lou McGranahan on July 5, 1952. They had three children: Melanie Ann, Kristi Colleen (deceased 1991) and Max Welton Coll III (Tres). During his first marriage, Coll served for three years in the United States Army in Germany. Coll and McGranahan ended their marriage December 22, 1969.

After the divorce, Coll moved to Albuquerque to attend Law School at the University of New Mexico School of Law where he graduated in 1974. He married his second wife, Sally Rodgers, on September 20, 1975 and moved to Santa Fe where he established a Law practice. Coll and Rodgers divorced on May 20, 2001.

On December 29, 2001, Coll married Catherine Joyce, a long-time resident of Taos and Santa Fe New Mexico. The two remained married until Coll's passing. When he passed the Fine Arts Education Act of 2003, he credited his wife, long a supporter of the Arts. The bill established and funded art, music, dance and drama in grade schools. As a result, the New Mexico Art Education Association was formed by the art teachers who then established "The Max Coll and Catherine Joyce-Coll Award for Excellence in Arts Education" to honor the couple. The award is given yearly.

Coll retired in 2004 but never lost interest in politics. He continued to mentor new legislators and occasionally lobbied a bill that interested him.

A skilled oarsman, Coll rowed many rivers during and after retiring from politics, including many Grand Canyon trips, the Tatshenshini River in Alaska and the Salmon River in Idaho. He would sometimes leave immediately after the end of a Legislative Session for a river trip.

Coll died March 27, 2014, in Santa Fe, New Mexico after suffering a massive stroke. He was remembered with a well-attended Memorial Service in the Rotunda of the New Mexico State Capitol with speeches by friends and colleagues and the haunting strains of bagpipes. Friends and family wept openly as "Danny Boy" was played.

Recognition 
In 2006, Coll was declared one of Santa Fe's Living Treasures for his contributions both as legislator and citizen. On February 21, 2013, Max Coll was honored by New Mexico's House of Representatives with House Memorial 62. Sponsored by Coll's longtime colleague Representative Luciano "Lucky" Varela, the memorial was passed with a unanimous vote. In 2015, the Santa Fe County Commission named the new community center in Eldorado, New Mexico, after him.

References 

1932 births
2014 deaths
People from Roswell, New Mexico
Military personnel from New Mexico
University of Missouri alumni
University of New Mexico School of Law alumni
Businesspeople from New Mexico
New Mexico lawyers
New Mexico Democrats
New Mexico Republicans
Members of the New Mexico House of Representatives
20th-century American businesspeople
20th-century American lawyers